George C. Virtue (1794 – 8 December 1868) was a 19th-century London-based publisher. His publishing house was located at 26 Ivy Lane, Paternoster Row.

Pictorial publisher
Virtue selected accomplished artists, employed the best engravers, and produced books that were rarely surpassed in elegance and correctness for the period. Chief among his publications were the following, all illustrated by William Henry Bartlett: Switzerland, by William Beattie, 2 vols. 1836; Scotland, by W. Beattie, 1838; The Waldenses, by W. Beattie, 1838; American Scenery, 2 vols. 1840; Description of the Beauties of the Bosphorus, by Julia Pardoe, 1840; and The Danube, its History and Scenery, by W. Beattie, 1844. Virtue created a prodigious business, issuing upwards of twenty thousand copper and steel engravings through his career.

Magazine publisher
In 1848, Virtue purchased two magazines.  One was an art publication, The Art Union, which had been founded in 1839 by Hodgson & Graves, then purchased in 1847 by Chapman & Hall.  The second purchase was controlling interest in Sharpe's London Magazine, a literary and cultural magazine, Arthur Hall publisher. In 1849, Virtue renamed the art magazine The Art Journal and, in time, it became known as the premier art publication of Great Britain. Also in 1849, he created a new firm with Arthur Hall called "Arthur Hall, Virtue & Co.".

Publishing houses
George Virtue
26 Ivy Lane, London
25 Paternoster Row, London
26 John Street, New York
Arthur Hall, Virtue & Co.

Family

Virtue's wife was named Helen.

Their oldest son, George Henry Virtue (d.1866)  was Treasurer of the Royal Numismatic Society for several years.

When Virtue retired from his publishing business in 1855, his second son, James Sprent Virtue, took over the business, having spent many years in the United States overseeing the Virtue's New York publishing house.

In 1861, the youngest son, William Alexander Virtue (d.1875), was promoted to Lieutenant, vice Turney, with the 39th Middlesex Rifle Volunteer Corps. In 
1865, he became a partner in the Virtue's City Road and Ivy Lane publishing houses before moving to the United States and taking over the Virtue's New York publishing house, including "Virtue and Yorston" with Charles H. Yorston.

Virtue's daughter, Frances Virtue (d.1878), married the English essayist and historian, James Augustus Cotter Morison in 1861.  They had one son, Theodore Morison, principal of Mohammedan Anglo-Oriental College from 1899–1905 which later on became Aligarh Muslim University and member of the Council of India from 1906; and daughters Helen Cotter, and Margaret.

Community service
Virtue was a common councilman for the ward of Farringdon Within, and later was the deputy of his ward. He was a member of the court of the Stationers' Company and a director of the Great Central Gas Company.

Legacy
Virtue retired in Oatlands Park. He died in 1868 at the home of his daughter, Frances Morison, on Porchester Square, London.
 Much of his correspondence and other family records are archived in the Smithsonian through a donation of documents by Virtue's great-great-grandson, Michael Virtue. He is buried in Walton-on-Thames Cemetery; the sculpture on his grave is by Joseph Edwards.

Selected publications
Musical scores

Pictorials

References

Attribution

1794 births
1868 deaths
Publishing companies of the United Kingdom
British book publishers (people)
British magazine publishers (people)
English engravers
People from the City of London
Members of the Council of India
19th-century British businesspeople